West Asher is a ghost town in Lulu Township, Mitchell County, Kansas, United States.

History
West Asher was issued a post office in 1878. The post office was discontinued in 1888.

References

Former populated places in Mitchell County, Kansas
Former populated places in Kansas